Frederick Derek Randall (5 February 1865 – 20 November 1946) was a British track and field athlete who competed at the 1900 Summer Olympics in Paris, France. Randall competed in the marathon. He was one of six runners who did not finish the race. He was born and died in Enfield, London.

References

External links 

 De Wael, Herman. Herman's Full Olympians: "Athletics 1900". Accessed 18 March 2006.
 

1865 births
1946 deaths
British male marathon runners
Olympic athletes of Great Britain
Athletes (track and field) at the 1900 Summer Olympics
People from Enfield, London
Athletes from London